Traditionally a clarinet quintet is a chamber musical ensemble made up of one clarinet, plus the standard string quartet of two violins, one viola, and one cello. Now the term clarinet quintet can refer to five B clarinets; four B clarinets and a bass clarinet; three B clarinets and two bass clarinets; one E clarinet, two B clarinets, and two bass clarinets; or one E clarinet, two B clarinets, one E alto clarinet, and one bass clarinet. The term is also used to refer to a piece written for one of these ensembles.

History
One of the earliest and most influential works  for this combination of instruments is Mozart's Quintet for Clarinet and Strings, K. 581, written for the clarinetist Anton Stadler  in 1789. Although a few compositions for this ensemble were produced over the following years, including the Clarinet Quintet in B major, Op. 34 by Carl Maria von Weber, a composer famous for his solo clarinet compositions, it was not until Johannes Brahms composed his Clarinet Quintet in B minor, Op. 115 for  Richard Mühlfeld that the clarinet quintet began to receive considerable attention from composers.

Works for clarinet quintet
 Wolfgang Amadeus Mozart – Clarinet Quintet in A major, K. 581 (1789)
 Johann Georg Heinrich Backofen - Clarinet Quintet in B major, Op. 15.
 Sigismund Neukomm - Clarinet Quintet in B major, Op. 8.
 Carl Maria von Weber – Clarinet Quintet in B major, Op. 34 (1811–1815)
 Giacomo Meyerbeer – Clarinet Quintet in E major (1813)
 Franz Krommer – Clarinet Quintet in B major, Op. 95 (1820)
 Anton Reicha – Clarinet Quintet in B major, Op. 89 (1820) and Quintet in F major for clarinet or oboe and string quartet, Op. 107 (1829)
 Heinrich Baermann – three clarinet quintets
 Thomas Täglichsbeck – Clarinet Quintet in B major, Op. 44 (1863) 
 Ferruccio Busoni – Suite in G minor, BV 176 (1880)
 Alexander Glazunov – Rêverie orientale, Op. 14 (1886)
 Johannes Brahms – Clarinet Quintet in B minor, Op. 115 (1891)
 Samuel Coleridge-Taylor – Clarinet Quintet in F minor, Op. 10 (1895)
 Henri Marteau – Clarinet Quintet in C minor, Op. 13 (1908)
 Joseph Holbrooke – Cavatina and Variations, Clarinet Quintet No. 1 in D minor, Op. 15b (1910) and Clarinet Quintet No. 2 Ligeia in G major, Op. 27 (1910, revised 1939 and c.1956; original title Fate)
 Robert Fuchs – Clarinet Quintet in E major, Op. 102 (1914)
 Alexander Krein – Three Sketches on Hebrew Themes for Clarinet Quintet, Op. 12 (1914) and Two Sketches on Hebrew Themes for Clarinet Quintet, Op. 13 (1914)
 Max Reger – Clarinet Quintet in A major, Op. 146 (1915–1916)
 Herbert Howells – Rhapsodic Quintet, Op. 31 (1917)
 Arthur Somervell – Clarinet Quintet in G major (1919)
 Paul Hindemith – Clarinet Quintet, Op. 30 (1923, revised 1954)
 Günter Raphael – Clarinet Quintet in F major, Op. 4 (1924)
 Quincy Porter – Clarinet Quintet (1929)
 Arthur Bliss – Clarinet Quintet, F. 20 (1932)
 Gordon Jacob – Clarinet Quintet in G minor (1939)
 Boris Papandopulo – Clarinet Quintet (1960)
 Paul Ben-Haim – Clarinet Quintet, Op. Op. 31a (1941, revised 1965)
 Morton Feldman – Two Pieces for Clarinet & String Quartet (1961); Clarinet & String Quartet (1983)
 Kurt George Roger – Clarinet Quintet, Op. 116 (1966)
 Bernard Herrmann – Souvenirs de voyage (1967)
 Jean Françaix – Clarinet Quintet (1977)
 Isang Yun – Clarinet Quintet No. 1 (1984) and Clarinet Quintet No. 2 (1994)
 Edison Denisov – Clarinet Quintet (1987)
 Dan Welcher – Quintet for Clarinet and String Quartet
 Ellen Taaffe Zwilich – Quintet for Clarinet and String Quartet (1990)
 Sean Osborn – Clarinet Quintet (1995) and Quintet for Clarinet and Strings, "The Beatles" (2004)
 Milton Babbitt – Clarinet Quintet (1996)
 Jennifer Higdon – Soliloquy
 Howard J. Buss – Millennium Visions (1999)
 Wolfgang Rihm – Vier Studien zu einem Klarinettenquintett (2002)
 Elliott Carter – Clarinet Quintet (2007)
 Ned Rothenberg – Quintet for clarinet and strings (2007)
 David Bruce – Gumboots (2008)
 Jesús Torres – Clarinet Quintet (2009)
 Airat Ichmouratov One Day of an Almost Ordinary Life, for klezmer clarinet and string quartet, Op. 47 / clarinet and string orchestra Op. 47A (2015)
 Geoffrey Gordon – Quintet for Clarinet and Strings (2015)
 Beat Furrer – intorno al bianco for clarinet and string quartet (2016)
 Jörg Widmann – Clarinet Quintet (2017)
 Theodore Antoniou – Clarinet Quintet (unknown)
  – Clarinet Quintet (unknown)

Composers such as Franz Krommer and Joseph Küffner for clarinet quintets which include two violas rather than two violins.

See also
Clarinet
String Quartet

References

External links
 
 http://clarinetquintet.web.unc.edu

Chamber music